Tanzanite is the blue and violet variety of the mineral zoisite (a calcium aluminium hydroxyl sorosilicate), caused by small amounts of vanadium. Tanzanite belongs to the epidote mineral group.

Tanzanite is noted for its remarkably strong trichroism, appearing alternately blue, violet and burgundy depending on crystal orientation. Tanzanite can also appear differently when viewed under different lighting conditions. The blues appear more evident when subjected to fluorescent light and the violet hues can be seen readily when viewed under incandescent illumination. In its rough state tanzanite is colored a reddish brown to clear, and it requires heat treatment to remove the brownish "veil" and bring out the blue violet of the stone. 

The gemstone was given the name 'tanzanite' by Tiffany & Co. after Tanzania, the country in which it was discovered. The scientific name of "blue-violet zoisite" was not thought to be sufficiently consumer friendly by Tiffany's marketing department, who introduced it to the market in 1968. In 2002, the American Gem Trade Association chose tanzanite as a December birthstone, the first change to their birthstone list since 1912.

Geology
Tanzanite was formed around 585 million years ago during the mid-Ediacaran Period by massive plate tectonic activity and intense heat in the area that would later become Mount Kilimanjaro. The mineral is located in a relatively complex geological environment. Deposits are typically found in the "hinge" of isoclinal folds.

Commercial history

He assumed that the mineral was olivine (peridot) but, after soon realizing it was not, he concluded it was "dumortierite" (a blue non-gem mineral). Shortly thereafter, the stones were shown to John Saul, a Nairobi-based consulting geologist and gemstone wholesaler who was then mining aquamarine in the region around Mount Kenya. Saul, who later discovered the famous ruby deposits in the Tsavo area of Kenya, eliminated dumortierite and cordierite as possibilities, and sent samples to his father, Hyman Saul, vice president at Saks Fifth Avenue in New York. Hyman Saul brought the samples across the street to the Gemological Institute of America which correctly identified the new gem as a variety of the mineral zoisite. Correct identification was also made by mineralogists at Harvard University, the British Museum, and Heidelberg University, but the very first person to get the identification right was Ian McCloud, a Tanzanian government geologist based in Dodoma.

Scientifically called "blue zoisite", the gemstone was renamed as tanzanite by Tiffany & Co., who wanted to capitalize on the rarity and single location of the gem, and thought that "blue zoisite" (which might be pronounced like "blue suicide") would not sell well. Tiffany's original campaign advertised that tanzanite could now be found in two places: "in Tanzania and at Tiffany's".

From 1967, an estimated two million carats of tanzanite were mined in Tanzania before the mines were nationalized by the Tanzanian government in 1971.

Tanzanite mining developments
In 1990, the Tanzanian government split the tanzanite mines into four sections: Blocks A, B, C and D. Blocks A and C were awarded to large operators, while Blocks B and D were reserved for the local miners. In 2005 the government renewed the lease of Block C mine to TanzaniteOne, who paid US$40 million for their lease and mining license.

In June 2003, the Tanzanian government introduced legislation banning the export of unprocessed tanzanite to India. (Like many gemstones, most tanzanite is cut in Jaipur.) The reason for the ban is to attempt to spur development of local processing facilities, thereby boosting the economy and recouping profits. This ban was phased in over a two-year period, until which time only stones over 0.5 grams were affected. In 2010, the government of Tanzania banned the export of rough stones weighing more than one gram.

TanzaniteOne Mining Ltd is owned by Richland Resources, but a 2010 law in Tanzania required them to cede 50% ownership of their mining license to the Tanzanian State Mining Company (Stamico).

Factors affecting value: grading
There is no universally accepted method of grading colored gemstones. TanzaniteOne, a major commercial player in the tanzanite market, through its non-profit subsidiary, the Tanzanite Foundation, has introduced its own color-grading system. The new system's color-grading scales divide tanzanite colors into a range of hues, between bluish-violet, indigo and violetish-blue.

The normal primary and secondary hues in tanzanite are blue and violet. Untreated tanzanite is a trichroic gemstone, meaning that light that enters this anisotropic crystal gets refracted on different paths, with different color absorption on each of the three optical axes. As a result of this phenomenon, a multitude of colors have been observed in various specimens: shades of purple, violet, indigo, blue, cyan, green, yellow, orange, red and brown. After heating, tanzanite becomes dichroic. The dichroic colors range from violet through bluish-violet to indigo and violetish-blue to blue.

Clarity grading in colored gemstones is based on the eye-clean standard, that is, a gem is considered flawless if no inclusions are visible with the unaided eye (assuming 20/20 vision). The Gemological Institute of America classifies tanzanite as a Type I gemstone, meaning it is normally eye-clean. Gems with eye-visible inclusions will be traded at deep discounts.

Heat treatment

Tanzanite forms as a brownish crystal and is trichroic, which means it shows three colors – brown, blue and violet – concurrently.  Heating, either underground naturally by metamorphic processes, or artificially, removes the brown or burgundy color component to produce a stronger violet-blue color and makes the stone "dichroic", which means it only reflects blue and violet. Rarely, gem-quality tanzanite will heat to a green primary hue, almost always accompanied by a blue or violet secondary hue.  These green tanzanite have some meaningful value in the collector market, but are seldom of interest to commercial buyers.

The stones should not have any cracks or bubbles, as they could shatter or the cracks/ bubble could increase in size during furnace heating.

Some stones found close to the surface in the early days of the discovery (in an area now called D block) were gem-quality blue without the need for heat treatment – probably the result of a wildfire in the area which heated the stones underground. This gave rise to the idea that "D block" stones were more desirable than tanzanite found in other areas of the small tanzanite mining area.

Since heat treatment is universal, it has no effect on price, and finished gems are assumed to be heat-treated. Gemological Institute of America states that the source of heating is gemologically undetectable, but is assumed because of its prevalence.

Tanzanite may be subjected to other forms of treatment as well. Recently, coated tanzanites were discovered and tested by the AGTA and AGL laboratories. A thin layer containing cobalt, determined by X-ray fluorescence, had been applied to improve the color. It was noted that "coatings in particular are not considered permanent", and in the United States are required to be disclosed at the point of sale.

Pleochroism in Tanzanite

Pleochroism has a physical property in which the gemstone will appear to have multiple colors based on the angle of the light hitting the stone. Tanzanite is a pleochroic gemstone. Most Tanzanite are blue when viewed from one direction but can vary from violet to red when seeing from a different angle.

The physical characters can make cutting process difficult due to the problem of selecting the perfect color. The finished color of the gemstone will vary depending on how the table cut reflects the light.

Imitation and cobalt-coated tanzanite
, tanzanite has never been successfully synthesized in a laboratory, so all genuine tanzanite is naturally occurring. However, because of its rarity and market demand, tanzanite has been imitated in several ways. Among the materials used for this are cubic zirconia, synthetic spinel, yttrium aluminium garnet, and colored glass. A test of the stone with a dichroscope can easily distinguish these from genuine tanzanite, as only tanzanite will appear doubly refractive: the two viewing windows of the dichroscope will display different colors (one window blue, the other violet) when viewing genuine tanzanite, while the imitation stones are all singly refractive and will cause both windows to appear the same color (violet).

Synthetic forsterite (the magnesium-rich end-member of olivine) has also been sold as tanzanite, and presents a similar appearance. It can be distinguished from tanzanite in three ways. The first is by using a refractometer: forsterite will show a refractive index of between 1.63 and 1.67, while tanzanite will show a higher index of 1.685 to 1.707. The second way is by using a Hanneman filter: through it, genuine tanzanite will appear orange-pink, while forsterite will appear green. The third way is by examining a cut stone through its crown facets and viewing the pavilion cuts at the back of the stone using a standard jeweler's loupe: forsterite will show birefringence, making the pavilion cuts appear "doubled up", while the much lower birefringence of tanzanite will not have this characteristic.

Lower grades of tanzanite are occasionally enhanced using a layer of cobalt, as cobalt imparts a deeper shade of blue. The cobalt layer does not adhere well to these stones, and tends to rub off over time, resulting in a much less intensely colored stone. Though still tanzanite, the practice of cobalt coating is considered deceptive unless well-advertised.

See also
 Manyara Region
 Arusha Region

References

External links

Epidote group
Gemstones
Orthorhombic minerals
Minerals in space group 62